The 1957 Beckenham by-election was held on 21 March 1957. It was held when the incumbent Conservative MP Patrick Buchan-Hepburn was elevated to a hereditary peerage. It was won by the Conservative candidate Philip Goodhart. Margaret Thatcher was one of the unsuccessful candidates for the Conservative nomination.

References

Beckenham,1957
Beckenham by-election
Beckenham by-election
Beckenham,1957
Beckenham,1957
1950s in Kent
Beckenham by-election